In Greek mythology, Molurus ( Molouros) was the son of Arisbas. In a surviving fragment of the poem Megalai Ehoiai, Molurus was killed by Hyettus of Argos when Hyettus caught him with his wife.

Note

References 

 Pausanias, Description of Greece with an English Translation by W.H.S. Jones, Litt.D., and H.A. Ormerod, M.A., in 4 Volumes. Cambridge, MA, Harvard University Press; London, William Heinemann Ltd. 1918. . Online version at the Perseus Digital Library
 Pausanias, Graeciae Descriptio. 3 vols. Leipzig, Teubner. 1903.  Greek text available at the Perseus Digital Library.

Characters in Greek mythology
Mythology of Achaea
Mythology of Argos